Oryphantes is a genus of dwarf spiders that was first described by J. E. Hull in 1932.

Species
 it contains five species:
Oryphantes aliquantulus Dupérré & Paquin, 2007 – USA, Canada
Oryphantes angulatus (O. Pickard-Cambridge, 1881) (type) – Europe
Oryphantes bipilis (Kulczyński, 1885) – Russia
Oryphantes cognatus (Tanasevitch, 1992) – Russia
Oryphantes geminus (Tanasevitch, 1982) – Russia, Kazakhstan

See also
 List of Linyphiidae species (I–P)

References

Araneomorphae genera
Linyphiidae
Spiders of Asia
Spiders of North America
Spiders of Russia